Hong Ji-hui (born 28 October 1972) is a South Korean backstroke swimmer. She competed in three events at the 1988 Summer Olympics.

References

External links
 

1972 births
Living people
South Korean female backstroke swimmers
Olympic swimmers of South Korea
Swimmers at the 1988 Summer Olympics
Place of birth missing (living people)